Castlerea railway station serves the town of Castlerea in County Roscommon, Ireland, opened on 15 November 1860.

The station is on the Dublin to Westport Rail service. Passengers to or from Galway travel to Athlone and change trains. Passengers to or from Ballina and Foxford travel to Manulla Junction and change trains.

See also
 List of railway stations in Ireland

References

External links
Irish Rail Castlerea Station Website

Iarnród Éireann stations in County Roscommon
Railway stations in County Roscommon
Railway stations opened in 1860